Lepidogma flagellalis is a species of snout moth in the genus Lepidogma. It is known from Borneo (it was described from Kuching).

References

Moths described in 1906
Epipaschiinae